Candyfloss and Medicine is the third studio album by Eddi Reader released in the UK on 8 July 1996, which peaked #24 in the UK charts.

Two singles were released in the UK: "Town Without Pity" and "Medicine" with various additional tracks including two covers from brother Frank's band Trashcan Sinatras: "Earlies" and "Sex Lives" and, nearly a decade before the hugely successful Robert Burns project, "John Anderson My Joe" and "Green Grow the Rashes".

The US release of the album the following year was enhanced by three additional tracks: "Sugar on the Pill", "If You Got a Minute, Baby" and "Shall I Be Mother?" which featured ex-Suede guitarist Bernard Butler.  The UK single "Town Without Pity" was dropped for this version.

Track listing

UK release
"Glasgow Star" (Reader, Borowiecki) – 4:51
"Town Without Pity" (Dimitri Tiomkin, Ned Washington) – 2:49
"Medicine" (Reader, Borowiecki, Hewerdine) – 4:12
"Rebel Angel" (Reader, Neill MacColl, Calum MacColl, Roy Dodds) – 4:43
"Semi Precious" (Reader, Borowiecki, Hewerdine) – 3:21
"Lazy Heart" (Reader, Hewerdine) – 5:25
"I Loved a Lad" (Traditional; arranged by Reader) – 5:01
"Butterfly Jar" (Reader, Hewerdine, Calum MacColl) – 5:33
"Candyfloss" (Hewerdine, Reader) – 3:23
"Darkhouse" (Reader, Calum MacColl) – 5:30

US release
"Glasgow Star"
"Candyfloss"
"Rebel Angel"
"Sugar on the Pill"
"Semi Precious"
"Medicine"
"If You Got a Minute, Baby"
"Lazy Heart"
"Shall I Be Mother?"
"Butterfly Jar"
"I Loved a Lad"
"Darkhouse"

Personnel

Eddi Reader – vocals, concertina, harmonica, piano
Boo Hewerdine – acoustic and electric guitars
Teddy Borowiecki – keyboards, guitar, bass, accordion, melodica, percussion
Roy Dodds – drums, percussion, hand claps, loop drumming
Calum MacColl – acoustic and electric guitars, bowed guitar, dulcimer, penny-whistle, zither
David Piltch – electric and acoustic bass
Bernard Butler – electric guitar
Dominic Miller – electric nylon guitar
Anthony Thistlethwaite – mandolin
The Electra Strings – strings
Kat Evans – fiddle, electric violin
Sid Gauld – trumpet
Richard Sidwell – trumpet
Michael Smith – tenor horn
Annie Whitehead – trombone
Martin Green – soprano saxophone
Misses La La – backing vocals

References

Eddi Reader albums
1996 albums
Blanco y Negro Records albums